Happy Valley is an unincorporated community in Calaveras County, California. It lies at an elevation of 1509 feet (460 m).

References

External links

Unincorporated communities in California
Unincorporated communities in Calaveras County, California